The 2016 Turkish Basketball Cup tournament, for sponsorship reasons the FIAT Turkish Cup, is the 31st edition of what the professional men's basketball teams of Turkey can vie for the Turkish Cup. The tournament was held at the Bursa Atatürk Sport Hall in Bursa, Turkey. It was held from February 17 to February 21.

Bracket

Final

Awards

MVP by Match 

For or each game a Most Valuable Player honour was handed out by the TBF this tournament.

Final MVP 
  Bogdan Bogdanović (Fenerbahçe)

See also 
2015–16 Turkish Basketball Super League

References 

Turkish Cup Basketball seasons
Cup